RGX was a body spray owned by Dial Corporation and launched in January 2007. The product was an attempt by Dial to break into the body spray market, currently dominated by AXE and Tag, through a marketing strategy directed at older men. RGX employed the Internet to create buzz via a men's lifestyle website called RGX Life, followed by television, print, and public relations activities. Television and online banners feature actress Rachel Specter. In 2009, the body spray line was discontinued.

Fragrances
RGX had six fragrance variants:

 CHILL
 RUSH
 SURGE
 REFRESH
 ICED
 PURE 50

References

External links
 RGX Bodyspray Official Website
 Dial Corporation

Personal care brands
Henkel brands
Perfumes
Viral marketing